1892 in the Philippines details events of note that happened in the Philippines in the year 1892.

Incumbents
Governor-General: Eulogio Despujol, 1st Count of Caspe

Events

May
May 5 – A fire ravages the Tiambeng family home in Orion, Bataan, destroying many of Francisco Balagtas' original manuscripts

June
June 26 – Rizal arrives in the Philippines from Europe via Hong Kong

July
July 3 – Rizal forms the La Liga Filipina
July 7
Rizal is arrested for establishing the La Liga Filipina
Andres Bonifacio secretly established the Katipunan
July 17 – Rizal is exiled to Dapitan

September
September 22 – In Paris, Filipino painter Juan Luna fatally shot his wife Paz Pardo de Tavera, who died 11 days later

Death
October 3 – Paz Pardo de Tavera

References

 
1890s in the Philippines